What Can Not Be Forgiven (Spanish: Lo que no se puede perdonar!..) is a 1953 Mexican drama film directed by Roberto Rodríguez and starring María Elena Marqués,  Armando Calvo and Domingo Soler.

Cast

References

Bibliography 
 María Luisa Amador. Cartelera cinematográfica, 1950-1959. UNAM, 1985.

External links 
 

1953 films
1953 drama films
Mexican drama films
1950s Spanish-language films
Films directed by Roberto Rodríguez
Mexican black-and-white films
1950s Mexican films